Nea Peramos railway station is a station in Nea Peramos, a suburb of the city of Megara, West Attica, Greece. It is located east of Megara, near the A8 motorway between Athens and Patras. It was opened on 27 September 2005 as part of the extension of the Athens Airport–Patras railway to Corinth and its current form dates to 2007. It should not be confused with the now-closed station on the old Piraeus–Patras railway, which is located within the city itself.

History
The station was opened on 27 September 2005 as part of the extension of the Athens Airport–Patras railway to Corinth, as part of Line 2 of the Athens Suburban Railway began serving the station. The station was further updated its current form dates to 2007. It should not be confused with the now-closed station on the old Piraeus–Patras railway SPAP, located within the city. In 2009, with the Greek debt crisis unfolding OSE's Management was forced to reduce services across the network. Timetables were cutback and routes closed, as the government-run entity attempted to reduce overheads. In 2017 OSE's passenger transport sector was privatised as TrainOSE, currently, a wholly-owned subsidiary of Ferrovie dello Stato Italiane infrastructure, including stations, remained under the control of OSE. In July 2022, the station began being served by Hellenic Train, the rebranded TranOSE.

Facilities
The raised station is assessed via stairs or lift. It has two side platforms, with station buildings located on platform 1, with access to the platform level via stairs or lift. The Station buildings are equipped with a staffed ticket office, toilets and cafe 'Platform 9 3/4 - coffee and more'. At platform level, there are sheltered seating an air-conditioned indoor passenger shelter and Dot-matrix display departure and arrival screens and timetable poster boards on both platforms. There is a car park on-site, adjacent to the eastbound line. Currently, there is no local bus stop connecting the station.

Services

Since 15 May 2022, the following weekday services call at this station:

Station layout

References

External links
 Nea Peramos railway station - National Railway Network Greek Travel Pages

Megara
Attica
West Attica
Buildings and structures in Attica
Transport in Attica
Railway stations in Attica
Railway stations opened in 2005